was a Japanese writer. Several of her stories have been adapted for film and television.

Film and television adaptations 
 Kaiketsu kurozukin zenpen (1936)
 (豹の眼) lit. Eye of the Jaguar (1956)
 (青竜の洞窟 Seiryū no dōkutsu) lit. Cave of the Blue Dragon (1956)
 , NHK, 1976
 , TBS, 1992

References

External links 
 http://www.jmdb.ne.jp/person/p0110410.htm
 https://www.imdb.com/name/nm2376963/

Japanese children's writers
Japanese women children's writers
20th-century Japanese novelists
People from Hiroshima Prefecture
1898 births
1983 deaths